Ibrahim Ezzaydouni (born 28 April 1991) is a Spanish track and field athlete. In 2019, he competed in the men's 3000 metres steeplechase event at the 2019 World Athletics Championships held in Doha, Qatar. He did not qualify to compete in the final.

References

External links 
 

Living people
1991 births
Place of birth missing (living people)
Spanish male middle-distance runners
Spanish male long-distance runners
Spanish male steeplechase runners
World Athletics Championships athletes for Spain
Spanish sportspeople of Moroccan descent
20th-century Spanish people
21st-century Spanish people